Carabus bessarabicus is a species of ground beetle from family Carabidae found in Moldova, Russia and Ukraine. The blackish-gray species could also be found in Kazakhstan.

Subspecies include:
Carabus bessarabicus concretus

References

bessarabicus
Beetles described in 1823
Beetles of Asia
Beetles of Europe